The 2018 Westminster City Council elections were held on 3 May 2018, the same day as other London Boroughs. All 60 seats were up for election along with the 12 seats of Queen's Park Community Council, the parish council in the north west of the city. Despite initial expectations of Labour gains across the borough, the Conservative party were able to hold the council and only lost 3 seats. The Conservatives won the popular vote across the borough by a small margin of 923 votes (1.7%), but nonetheless won a decisive victory in terms of seats, winning 41 councillors to Labour's 19.

The Conservatives, Labour and the Liberal Democrats all ran full slates of 60 candidates. There were also candidates from the Greens as well as three from the Campaign Against Pedestrianisation of Oxford Street.

The count took place in Lindley Hall and ran overnight.

Result

|}

Ward results
The percentage of vote share and majority are based on the average for each party's votes in each ward. The raw majority number is the margin of votes between the lowest-placed winning party candidate and the opposition party's highest-placed losing candidate. Starred candidates are the incumbents.

Abbey Road

Bayswater

Bryanston and Dorset Square

Results are compared with the 2014 council election, not the 2015 by-election.

Church Street

Results are compared with the 2014 council election, not the 2016 by-election.

Churchill

Murad Gassanly was elected in 2014 as a Labour Party candidate, before becoming an Independent and then joining the Conservative Party. The change in his share of the vote is shown from his result as a Labour candidate in 2014.

Harrow Road

Results are compared with the 2014 council election, not the 2015 by-election.

Hyde Park

Knightsbridge and Belgravia

Lancaster Gate

Little Venice

Maida Vale

Marylebone High Street

Queen's Park

Regent's Park

St James's

Tachbrook

Vincent Square

Warwick

Results are compared with the 2014 council election, not the 2015 by-election.

West End

Westbourne

Queen's Park (Community Council)
Elections to Queen's Park Community Council were held alongside the City Council elections.  Eight candidates were returned unopposed in three wards, with the ninth seat filled by a co-option, while the fourth ward was contested returning the votes shown below. The Community Council was counted at the same time as the City Council seats.

2018 and 2021 by-elections

The by-election was called following the resignation of Cllr. Robert J. Davis.

The by-election was called following the resignation of Cllr. Andrea Mann.

References 

Westminster
Council,2018
2010s in the City of Westminster